Danny Jacob (born October 8, 1956) is an American composer, songwriter and guitarist. His credits include composing the score for the television series Phineas and Ferb, and co-producing the music for the series Sofia The First. He is a three-time Emmy-nominated composer. He also wrote the theme songs for Lilo & Stitch: The Series, The Emperor's New School, Kim Possible, Sonny With A Chance, and Jackie Chan Adventures. As a featured guitarist, Jacob has performed on Shrek, the Bette Midler HBO concert Diva Las Vegas, and on Ray Charles and Aretha Franklin's "Heaven Help Us".

Career

Jacob started playing guitar at 13 years old, honing his skills in acoustic, electric, R&B, and jazz playing styles. At 16 years old he formed his own bands, performing in local bars and clubs in Los Angeles. Jacob has played and toured with recording artists: Bette Midler, George Michael, and Tower of Power, and said he has been inspired by Hans Zimmer, John Powell, and Harry Gregson-Williams. During DreamWorks' founding years, Zimmer and Jacob worked together on the soundtracks for The Road to El Dorado and Antz. This led to his work as a featured guitarist with score composers Harry Gregson-Williams and John Powell on Shrek. Jacob arranged and co-produced the musical DVD sequence "Shrek in the Swamp Karaoke Dance Party" along with Eddie Murphy's cover of "I'm a Believer" from the soundtrack album. He also composed the instrumental score for Ringling Bros. and Barnum & Bailey Circus presents Zing Zang Zoom in 2009.

He began working on various Disney TV Animation series, producing and writing theme songs for Lilo & Stitch: The Series and The Emperor's New School. Ultimately, he was brought on to revamp the theme song for Phineas and Ferb before behind hired as the show's composer and song producer. He continued to work with creators Dan Povenmire and Jeff "Swampy" Marsh on their next series, Milo Murphy's Law, two Phineas and Ferb feature films (Phineas and Ferb: Across the 2nd Dimension and Phineas and Ferb: Candace Against the Universe) and various specials, and again with Povenmire on the new series Hamster & Gretel. He co-composed the score for the Amazon Kids+ series ARPO: Robot Babysitter with his son, Aaron Daniel Jacob.

Personal life

He was married to Grammy-nominated film music producer Marylata Elton. They have one child, composer and filmmaker Aaron Daniel Jacob.

In 2011, Jacob and Marylata established an endowment for the Teenage Drama Workshop at California State University Northridge.  He is a native of San Fernando Valley, California.

Discography

Filmography

Film

Television

Internet

References

External links
 DannyJacobMusic.com
 
Danny Jacob's Credits and Awards

1956 births
20th-century American composers
20th-century American guitarists
20th-century American male musicians
American male composers
American male guitarists
American male songwriters
Guitarists from Los Angeles
Living people